Surgical emergency is a medical emergency for which immediate surgical intervention is the only way to solve the problem successfully.

The following conditions are surgical emergencies:

 Acute trauma

Cardiothoracic
 Cardiac tamponade
 Acute airway obstruction
 Pneumothorax

Gastrointestinal
 Acute appendicitis
 Bowel obstruction
 Gastrointestinal perforation
 Intestinal volvulus
 Acute mesenteric ischemia
 Peritonitis
 Stercoral perforation

Genitourinary
 Testicular torsion
 Urinary retention
 Paraphimosis
 Priapism

Gynaecological
 Ovarian torsion
 Bleeding ectopic pregnancy
 Retained abortion

Neurological/Ophthalmic
 Acute subdural hematoma
 Retinal detachment

Vascular
 Ruptured aortic aneurysm
 Aortic dissection
 Internal bleeding
 Limb ischemia

See also
 List of medical emergencies
 Advanced Trauma Life Support

References
 Monson JRT, Duthie G, O'Malley K (Eds.). Surgical Emergencies. Blackwell Science (UK), 1999. 

Emergency medicine